Tomáš Kratochvíl (born 19 December 1971, in Prague) is a retired Czech race walker who represented the club USK Praha. In 1995 he participated at the 1995 World Championships (20 km), but was disqualified. He also finished 34th at the 1995 IAAF World Race Walking Cup. In 1996 he finished 48th at the 1996 Olympic Games (20 km). He also competed at the 1997 IAAF World Race Walking Cup. He became Czech champion in 1997 (20 km).

References

	

1971 births
Living people
Czech male racewalkers
Athletes (track and field) at the 1996 Summer Olympics
Olympic athletes of the Czech Republic
Athletes from Prague